You Don't Know Me: The Best of Armand Van Helden is a greatest hits album by American electronic music producer and DJ Armand Van Helden.

Track listing
Disc 1
"You Don't Know Me" (featuring Duane Harden)
"The Funk Phenomena"
"My My My" (featuring Tara McDonald)
"I Want Your Soul"
"NYC Beat"
"Full Moon" (featuring Common)
"Witch Doktor"
"Koochy"
"Ultrafunkula"
"Touch Your Toes" (featuring Fat Joe And Bl)
"This Ain't Hollywood" (featuring 'tha Wiz' Lemay)
"Playmate" (featuring Roxy Cottontail and Lacole 'Tigga' Campbell)
"Je T'aime" (featuring Nicole Roux)
"Why Can't You Free Some Time"
"Flowerz" (featuring Roland Clark)
"Necessary Evil"
"Sugar" (featuring Jessy Moss)
"Into Your Eyes"
"Hear My Name" (featuring Spalding Rockwell)
"When the Lights Go Down"
Disc 2 - Commissioned Remixes
"Professional Widow (It's Got to Be Big)" - Tori Amos
"Spin Spin Sugar" - Sneaker Pimps
"What You Waiting For" - No Doubt
"Bizarre Love Triangle" - New Order
"Sugar Is Sweeter" - CJ Bolland
"Toxic" - Britney Spears
"Digital" - Goldie
"Sexyback" - Justin Timberlake & Timbaland
"Plug It In" - Basement Jaxx
"Da Funk" - Daft Punk

Release history

References

Armand Van Helden albums
2008 remix albums
2008 greatest hits albums